Taylor Henrich (born 1 November 1995) is a Canadian ski jumper.

Born in Calgary, Alberta, Henrich began the sport at age seven. Henrich competed Canada at the 2014 Winter Olympics in the premier of Ski jumping at the 2014 Winter Olympics – Women's normal hill individual and her ranking in 2013/2014 was 23rd. She reached her first World Cup podium with a 3rd place in Oberstdorf Germany on 25 January 2015. This is also the first ever Ladies World Cup podium for Canada. Taylor is still active in the nordic sport world and is in pursuit of representing Canada for a third time in Women's nordic combined at the 2022 Winter Olympics.

Career

2014 Winter Olympics 
Henrich was named to debut in the Historical Olympic event on January 26, 2014.

2018 Winter Olympics
Henrich was named to her second Olympic team on January 24, 2018.

References

External links 
 

Canadian female ski jumpers
Olympic ski jumpers of Canada
Skiers from Calgary
1995 births
Living people
Ski jumpers at the 2014 Winter Olympics
Ski jumpers at the 2018 Winter Olympics
Ski jumpers at the 2012 Winter Youth Olympics
Youth Olympic bronze medalists for Canada
21st-century Canadian women